The De Lesseps River is a river in the Unorganized Part of Thunder Bay District in Northwestern Ontario, Canada. The river is part of the James Bay drainage basin and is a right tributary of the Miniss River.

The river begins at an unnamed lake and heads east then northeast to De Lesseps Lake, where De Lesseps Lake Airport is located on the eastern shore. It leaves the lake north, and reaches its mouth at Miniss Lake on the Miniss River. The Miniss River flows to Lake St. Joseph, then via the Albany River to James Bay.

References

Sources

Rivers of Thunder Bay District